Streptocarpus glandulosissimus, called the Cape primrose (along with other members of its subgenus Streptocarpus), is a species of flowering plant in the genus Streptocarpus, native to the central African lakes region; eastern Democratic Republic of the Congo, Uganda, Rwanda, Burundi, Tanzania and Kenya. It has gained the Royal Horticultural Society's Award of Garden Merit.

References

glandulosissimus
Flora of Burundi
Flora of the Democratic Republic of the Congo
Flora of Rwanda
Flora of East Tropical Africa
Garden plants of Africa
Plants described in 1893